Manuel Margot Gomez (born September 28, 1994) is a Dominican professional baseball center fielder for the Tampa Bay Rays of Major League Baseball (MLB). He previously played for the San Diego Padres.

Minor league career

Boston Red Sox
The Boston Red Sox signed Margot as an international free agent from the Dominican Prospect League in July 2011, receiving a reported bonus of $800,000. At age 17, he started his professional career with Rookie Level Dominican Summer League Red Sox in their 2012 season. In his professional debut, Margot earned Red Sox Minor League Latin Program Player of the Year honors, after batting a .285/.382/.423 slash line with 38 stolen bases in just 68 games, gaining a spot on the DSL All-Star team. Regarded as a patient hitter, he walked more than he struck out in the DSL (36-to-25 in 260 at-bats).

Margot jumped up two levels to the Lowell Spinners in 2013, and played as the youngest regular in the Short-Season A New York–Penn League. Following his successful debut, Margot did manage to get a hit in 12 out of his first 15 games with Lowell, collecting a .254/.343/.307 line through July 24, when a hamstring injury laid him up. After a disabled list stint, he returned on August 16 showing glimpses of his potential with a .447/.475/.658 line over his first eight games back. He finished the year with a .270 average and 18 stolen bases in only 49 games.

Margot played for the Low A Greenville Drive of the South Atlantic League in 2014. In his first 99 games at Greenville, he posted a .282/.362/.418 line with 10 home runs and 45 runs batted in, while leading the Drive with 105 hits and 61 runs scored, and the Red Sox organization with 39 stolen bases. As a result, he was promoted to High A Salem Red Sox of the Carolina League on August 15. In 2014, Margot hit .340/.356/.560 in just 18 games for Salem, combining for a .293/.356/.462 line with 12 homers and 59 RBI in 115 contests in the two stints. Besides, he led the Sox minors system with 42 stolen bases. It was just the latest part in what was a very solid season in the organization despite his youth. As such, he climbed from No. 11 to No. 4 in the MLB.com Top 20 Boston Red Sox Prospects list.

In 2015, Margot improved his slash line up to .282/.321/.420 through 46 games with Salem, and earned a promotion to the Double-A Portland Sea Dogs in the midseason. His five triples were tied for third-most in the Carolina League, while his 20 steals in 25 attempts ranked fourth in the circuit at the time of his promotion. Soon after, MLB.com announced that he would be member of the World Team in the Futures Game prior to the Major League All-Star Game. Margot then posted a combined .271/.326/.419 batting line with 25 extra bases and 19 steals over 109 games played for the Sea Dogs. During the Sea Dogs annual Field of Dream Fan Appreciation Game at Hadlock Field, he hit for the cycle and drove in a season-high five runs as the Sea Dogs topped the New Britain Rock Cats, 10–5, becoming the first ever Portland player to hit a cycle at Hadlock Field.

San Diego Padres
On November 13, 2015, the San Diego Padres acquired Margot, Javier Guerra, Carlos Asuaje, and Logan Allen from the Red Sox for Craig Kimbrel. On November 19, 2015, the Padres added Margot to their 40-man roster to protect him from the Rule 5 draft.

Margot began the 2016 season with the Triple-A El Paso Chihuahuas, where he played in 124 games, including 117 starts in center field.  He batted .304 with 6 home runs and a .777 OPS.  The Padres promoted him to the major leagues on September 21, 2016.

Major league career

San Diego Padres
In his September, 2016, call up, Margot played in 10 games, including seven starts in center field and one in right.

Despite a knee injury that limited his playing time in spring training, Margot made the 2017 Opening Day roster as the starting center fielder.  Margot hit five extra-base hits in his first six games of the 2017 season, including two home runs in consecutive plate appearances against San Francisco Giants starter Matt Cain on April 8, and two doubles off of Giants starter Madison Bumgarner on April 9.  Margot missed about a month of the season in May and June with a calf injury.  Margot finished the 2017 season with a .263/.313/.409 batting line with 13 home runs in 126 games, including 121 starts in center field.  He finished sixth in the NL Rookie of the Year voting.

Margot was the Padres regular center fielder in 2018, starting 123 games there, and only missing 10 days on the disabled list with bruised ribs in April.  His batting line on the season dropped to .245/.292/.384 with 8 home runs and 11 stolen bases.  He was considered to be a plus defender in center field, without making many highlight plays.

Margot began losing time in center field in 2019, making 98 starts there while Wil Myers picked up 58 of the center field starts.  Margot effectively became part of a platoon with left-handed hitting corner outfielder Josh Naylor in the latter part of the season.  Margot still played in a career-high 151 games on the season, often coming in as a pinch hitter or defensive replacement.  Margot batted .234/.304/.387 on the year, with 12 home runs in 398 at-bats.  He had 20 stolen bases in 24 attempts.  On defense, Margot led the Padres with 11 outs above average, ranking fourth in the National League.

Tampa Bay Rays
On February 8, 2020, the Padres traded Margot and prospect Logan Driscoll to the Tampa Bay Rays in exchange for Emilio Pagán. Before being traded to the Rays, Margot had only played 8 innings not in center field. However, the defensive prowess of Kevin Kiermaier caused Margot to play more innings in left and right field. Margot ended the season batting .269 with one home run and 12 stolen bases. The Rays ended the season with the best record in the American League. In the Wild Card Series against the Toronto Blue Jays, Margot went three for seven with one home run and three RBIs. In the Division Series against the New York Yankees, Margot went one for nine with a two-run home run. The Rays would beat the Yankees in five games. In game 1 of the American League Championship Series against the Houston Astros, Margot hit a three-run home run in the first inning. In the second inning, Margot flipped over the wall in right field to record an out on a foul ball. Despite this game being played in his former home field (Petco Park), Margot was unaware that the drop over this wall was approximately six feet. In game 6 of the ALCS, Margot hit two home runs recording three RBIs as the Rays lost by three. The Rays would go on to beat the Astros in seven games and advanced to the World Series. In Game 5 of the World Series against the Los Angeles Dodgers, Margot attempted to steal home in the fourth inning but was called out after a close putout at the plate to end the inning.

On April 5, 2022, Margot and the Rays agreed to a two-year contract extension worth $19 million, with a mutual option for 2025.

On June 20, 2022, Margot was carted off the field with a leg injury and was subsequently placed on the 10-day injured list with a sprained knee.

Personal life
Margot's wife, Rachell, gave birth to a son, Diamond, in July, 2017.  The family added a second child in April, 2019.

References

External links

MiLB.com

1994 births
Living people
Dominican Republic expatriate baseball players in the United States
Dominican Summer League Red Sox players
El Paso Chihuahuas players
Greenville Drive players
Lowell Spinners players
Major League Baseball outfielders
Major League Baseball players from the Dominican Republic
Portland Sea Dogs players
Salem Red Sox players
San Diego Padres players
Tampa Bay Rays players
Toros del Este players